TDSHS may refer to:

Texas Department of State Health Services
Tennessee Department of Safety and Homeland Security